Dominic W. Massaro is Professor of Psychology and Computer Engineering at the University of California, Santa Cruz. He is best known for his fuzzy logical model of perception, and more recently, for his development of the computer animated talking head Baldi. Massaro is director of the Perceptual Science Laboratory, past president of the Society for Computers in Psychology, book review editor for the American Journal of Psychology, founding Chair of UCSC's Digital Arts and New Media program, and was founding co-editor of the interdisciplinary journal Interpreting. He has been a Guggenheim Fellow, a University of Wisconsin Romnes Fellow, a James McKeen Cattell Fellow, an NIMH Fellow, and in 2006 was recognized as a Tech Museum Award Laureate.

Massaro received his B.A. in Psychology from the University of California, Los Angeles in 1965, and completed his Ph.D. in Mathematical Psychology at the University of Massachusetts Amherst in 1968. After his postdoctoral work at the University of California, San Diego, he was Professor of Psychology at the University of Wisconsin, Madison from 1970 to 1979, before moving to UCSC where he has remained since.

Massaro's research focuses on applying an information processing approach to the study of language, perception, memory, cognition, and decision making. In collaboration with Gregg Oden, he developed the fuzzy logical model of perception, which stresses the integration of multiple sources of information when modeling perception. This model has been shown to be mathematically equivalent to Bayes' theorem. Massaro's approach conflicts with the motor theory of speech perception and Massaro has been a  critic.

Stemming from this early work, Massaro established a research program demonstrating the importance of information from the face in speech perception. As part of this program, Massaro, along with researcher Michael Cohen, developed the computer animated talking head known as Baldi. The Baldi technology is special in its extraordinary accuracy, and has been expanded to speak in numerous languages. In recent years, Massaro has become more involved with applied research, using his talking head technology to benefit language learners, including those facing learning challenges such as deafness and autism. For this work, he was named a 2006 Tech Microsoft Education Award Laureate by the Tech Museum of Innovation.

One focus of his current research is on the development and theoretical and applied use of a completely synthetic and animated head (iBaldi) for speech synthesis, language tutoring, and edutainment. Massaro founded Psyentific Mind, Inc with the goal of using Behavioral Science and Technology to extend the range of the human mind. The company currently has 8 iPhone/iPad apps in the Apple app store. These include apps for enhancing literacy, phonics, tile matching games for learning vocabulary and phonics, automated speech recognition in face to face communication, and learning to tell time with Kid Klok, an easy-to-read analog clock for children.

Massaro is husband to ceramicist Karen Thuesen Massaro and father to Pia T. Massaro and Andrew T. Massaro

Honors and awards
 Laureate, Tech Microsoft Education Award, Tech Museum of Innovation in San Jose, 2006
 Fellow, Association for Psychological Science, elected 1997
 Fellow, Society of Experimental Psychologists, elected 1990
 Recipient, James McKeen Cattell Sabbatical Fellowship, 1988–1989
 President, Society for Computers in Psychology, 1985
 Fellow, American Psychological Association, elected 1980
 Romnes Fellowship, University of Wisconsin, 1977
 NIMH Special Research Fellowship Award, 1975–1976
 Recipient, John Simon Guggenheim Fellowship, 1975–1976
 NIMH Postdoctoral Fellowship, 1968–1970

Selected bibliography

Symbiotic Value of an Embodied Agent in Language Learning. In Sprague, R.H., Jr. (Ed.), IEEE Proceedings of 37th Annual Hawaii International Conference on System Sciences (CD-ROM), Computer Society Press, 10 pages, 2004. Best paper in Emerging Technologies.
Massaro, DW. and Light, J. Using visible speech for training perception and production of speech for hard of hearing individuals. Journal of Speech, Language, and Hearing Research, 2004, 47(2), 304–320.
From Multisensory Integration to Talking Heads and Language Learning. In G. Calvert, C. Spence and B.E. Stein (Eds.), Handbook of Multisensory Processes, 2004, (pp. 153–176). Massachusetts: MIT Press.
de la Vaux, S.K. and Massaro, DW. Audiovisual Speech Gating: Examining Information and Information Processing. Cognitive Processing (Special Issue devoted to Multisensory Processing), 2004, (2), 106–112.
Massaro, DW., Cohen, M.M., Campbell, C.S. and Rodriguez, T. Bayes Factor of Model Selection Validates FLMP. Psychonomic Bulletin and Review, 2001, 8, 1-17.
Perceiving Talking Faces: From Speech Perception to a Behavioral Principle. Cambridge, MA: MIT Press, 1998.
Massaro, D.W., and Stork, D.G. Speech recognition and sensory integration, American Scientist, 1998, 86, 236–244.

References

External links
 Perceptual Science Lab
 UC Santa Cruz Psychology
 UCSC's Digital Arts and New Media
 WestsideSantaCruz.org

Living people
American cognitive scientists
Speech perception researchers
Fellows of the Society of Experimental Psychologists
University of California, Los Angeles alumni
University of Massachusetts Amherst alumni
University of California, Santa Cruz faculty
University of Wisconsin–Madison faculty
Year of birth missing (living people)